Miserere (Latin imperative of misereor 'have mercy' or 'have pity') may refer to:

 Psalm 51, referred to as "Miserere" because of its opening words, "Miserere mei, Deus"

Music

Classical compositions
 Musical settings of Psalm 51, the "Miserere", include:
 Miserere (Josquin), c. 1503 motet setting by Josquin des Prez
 Miserere nostri, 1575 composition by Thomas Tallis
 Miserere (Allegri), 1630s musical setting by Gregorio Allegri
 Miserere, 1735 motet by French composer Joseph Michel
 "Miserere", from the 1853 opera Il Trovatore by Verdi
 Miserere (Górecki), 1981 work by Henryk Górecki
 Miserere (Pärt), 1989/1992 work by Arvo Pärt
 Miserere, 2009 by  James MacMillan

Albums and popular songs
 Miserere (album), by Zucchero, 1992, and its title song
 Miserere, an album by Bruno Pelletier, 1997
 "Miserere", a song by The Cat Empire from the 2005 album Two Shoes
 "Miserere", a song by Katherine Jenkins from the 2004 album Première
 "Miserere Mei", a song by Myriads from the 2002 album Introspection

Other uses
 , a 2008 novel by Jean-Christophe Grangé
 The Mark of the Angels – Miserere, a 2013 French thriller film based on the novel 
 Miserere, a 1948 suite of lithographs by Georges Rouault
 Plaza Miserere, a plaza in Buenos Aires, Argentina

See also
 
 Kyrie (disambiguation)